The year 1660 in science and technology involved some significant events.

Events
 November 28 – At Gresham College in London, twelve men, including Christopher Wren, Robert Boyle, John Wilkins, and Robert Moray, meet after a lecture by Wren and resolve to found "a College for the Promoting of Physico-Mathematicall Experimentall Learning", which will become the Royal Society.

Botany
 John Ray publishes Catalogus plantarum circa Cantabrigiam nascentium in Cambridge, the first flora of an English county.

Mathematics
 The popular English-language edition by Isaac Barrow of Euclid's Elements is published in London.

Physics
 Robert Boyle publishes New Experiments Physico-Mechanicall, Touching the Spring of the Air and its Effects (the second edition in 1662 will contain Boyle's Law).

Births
 February 19 – Friedrich Hoffmann, German physician and chemist (died 1742)
 April 16 – Hans Sloane, Ulster Scots-born collector and physician (died 1753)
 March 15 – Olof Rudbeck the Younger, Swedish naturalist (died 1740)
 May 27 (bapt.) – Francis Hauksbee, English scientific instrument maker and experimentalist (died 1713)
 approx. date – Edward Lhuyd, Welsh naturalist (died 1709)
 Date unknown – Jeanne Dumée, French astronomer (born 1660)

Deaths
 May 29 – Frans van Schooten, Dutch Cartesian mathematician (born 1615)
 June 30 – William Oughtred, English mathematician who invented the slide rule (born 1574)
 Jean-Jacques Chifflet, French physician and antiquary (born 1588)
 Walter Rumsey, Welsh judge and amateur scientist (born 1584)

References

 
17th century in science
1660s in science